The 1998–99 Cymru Alliance was the ninth season of the Cymru Alliance after its establishment in 1990. The league was won by Flexsys Cefn Druids.

League table

External links
Cymru Alliance

Cymru Alliance seasons
2
Wales